Šentvid pri Stični ( or) is a settlement in the Municipality of Ivančna Gorica in central Slovenia. The area is part of the historical region of Lower Carniola. The municipality is now included in the Central Slovenia Statistical Region. In addition to the sections of the main settlement known as Stari Trg and Zadolžna Vas, it includes the hamlets of Travnik, Sveti Rok, Omotce, Postaja Šentvid, and Marof.

Churches
The parish church from which the settlement gets its name is dedicated to Saint Vitus and belongs to the Roman Catholic Archdiocese of Ljubljana. It was first mentioned in written documents dating to 1136. A second church on a hill just south of the settlement is dedicated to Saint Roch and dates to the 17th century.

Notable people
Notable people that were born or lived in Šentvid pri Stični include:
 (1856–1936), educator
Marko Gerbec (1658–1718), physician
Ivan Janežič (1855–1922), priest
Josip Korban (1883–1966), youth writer
Franc Ksaver Kutnar (1793–1846), prince-bishop
 (1865–1951), politician
Ivan Markelj (1852–1903), educator
 (1817–1898), priest, Franciscan friar
Janez Stritar (1818–1882), priest, religious writer
 (1870–1956), veterinary physician
Ivan Vencajz (1844–1913), lawyer, judge, politician
Janko Vencajz (1872–1895), historian
Stanko Vurnik (1898–1952), art historian, ethnologist, musicologist

References

External links

Šentvid pri Stični on Geopedia

Populated places in the Municipality of Ivančna Gorica